Dumka district is one of the twenty-four districts of Jharkhand state in eastern India. Dumka is the administrative headquarters of this district. This district covers an area of 3716.02 km. This district has a population of 1,321,442 (2011 Census).

Economy
In 2006, the Indian government named Dumka one of the country's 250 most backward districts (out of a total of 640). It is one of the 21 districts in Jharkhand currently receiving funds from the Backward Regions Grant Fund Programme (BRGF).

Demographics
According to the 2011 census Dumka district has a population of 1,321,442, roughly equal to the nation of Mauritius or the US state of New Hampshire. This gives it a ranking of 370th in India (out of a total of 640). Its population growth rate over the decade 2001-2011 was  19.39%. Dumka has a sex ratio of 974 females for every 1000 males, and a literacy rate of 62.54%. Scheduled Castes and Scheduled Tribes make up 6.02% and 43.22% of the population respectively.

Hindus are 79.06%, Muslims are 8.09%, Christians 6.54% and Sarna 5.95%.

At the time of the 2011 Census of India, 39.71% of the population spoke Santali, 34.44% Khortha, 9.59% Bengali, 6.64% Hindi, 2.40% Malto and 1.86% Urdu as their first language. 3.02% of the population recorded their language as 'Others' under Hindi.

Politics 

 |}

Villages
 

Kumirdaha

See also
Maluti temples

References

External links 
 Official website

 
Districts of Jharkhand